Mount Zion Cemetery is a historic cemetery in Walnut Ridge, Arkansas, located north of the junction of Fulbright Avenue and Mills Street near the entrance to Williams Baptist University. The earliest confirmed burial dates to 1875, and approximately 360 burials are known to have occurred in the cemetery since then, with most taking place in the late 1800s and early 1900s. A church and school were once located adjacent to the cemetery, but both are no longer extant. The Walnut Ridge Army Airfield was constructed near the cemetery during World War II. After a cycle of neglect and restoration in the 1970s and 1980s, the cemetery was thereafter maintained by the municipality of College City until College City's 2017 consolidation with Walnut Ridge.

The cemetery was listed on the National Register of Historic Places in 2021.

See also
 National Register of Historic Places listings in Lawrence County, Arkansas

References

External links
 
 

Cemeteries on the National Register of Historic Places in Arkansas
Lawrence County, Arkansas
National Register of Historic Places in Lawrence County, Arkansas
Cemeteries established in the 1870s